Guy Off the Hook is a television series which began airing on Food Network in September 2008. The show is hosted by Guy Fieri and closely follows the format of shows such as Paula's Party and Emeril Live. The show is taped in front of a studio audience, which Fieri often engages. The food presented is similar to the California cuisine type dishes Fieri favors on Guy's Big Bite.

References

Food Network original programming
2008 American television series debuts
2008 American television series endings
2000s American cooking television series
English-language television shows